The Black Forest North Perimeter Way is a 55-kilometre-long hiking  trail in three stages running from Mühlacker to Karlsruhe-Durlach in Germany.

History 
The northernmost east-west route of the Black Forest Club was opened in 1980. In May 2006 it was re-opened with a different route and waymarks along its entire length. Hitherto it had followed the access paths of the Westweg via the Schwanner Warte.

Short description 
From its start point at Mühlacker the route runs via Öschelbronn and Eutingen an der Enz to the northern edge of the borough of Pforzheim. Passing the Wallberg it leads through very varied, open countryside to Ellmendingen, Dietenhausen and Langensteinbach. Via Thomashof and Turmberg the end point of Karlsruhe-Durlach is reached.

Day tours/stages

First Stage: Mühlacker – Pforzheim

Overview 

 Distance: 21 km

Route description 
Initially the  der North Perimeter Way follows the Gäurand Way via the ruins of Löffelstelz to the south and the Eppingen Lines Way to Öschelbronn. After the Waldschanz with its replica of a chartaque it crosses the A 8 motorway. The way descends into the Enz valley to Eutingen and up the opposite side again to the Wartberg. After running along a ridgeway with extensive views it reaches the town of Pforzheim.

Second Stage: Pforzheim – Langensteinbach

Overview 

 Distance: 19.5 km

Route description 
From Pforzheim the route runs over the Wilferdingen Heights and passes below the Wallberg. The way next crosses open country through the vineyards of Dietlingen heading for Ellmendingen. At the  Dietenhäuser Mühle (mill) it crosses the Pfinz valley. Leading through scattered orchards and woods the path reaches Langensteinbach.

Third Stage: Langensteinbach – Karlsruhe-Durlach

Overview 

 Distance: 14.3 km

Route description 
One kilometre southwest of the town hall, on the edge of the town, is the Chapel of St. Barbara and Langensteinbach Castle. From Langensteinbach Town Hall the route runs in the direction of the A 8 motorway, which it passes under at Karlsbad.  Passing Stupferich it continues via the Thomashof and Rittnerthof to the hill of Turmberg. From there the destination of Karlsruhe-Durlach is already visible and is reached after a steep descent. The waymarking ends in Durlach at the terminus of the tramway line.

References

Literature 
Martin Kuhnle: Black Forest Mitte/Nord. Bergverlag Rother, Munich, 2013, pp. 46–59.

External links 
 Black Forest hiking service: web facility of the Black Forest Club for visualising the Black Forest trails on Google Maps with various overlays (trail network, waymarks, accommodation, …)

Hiking trails in Baden-Württemberg
Transport in the Black Forest